The 2015 Bremen state election was held on 10th May, 2015 to elect the members of the Bürgerschaft of Bremen, as well as the city councils of Bremen and Bremerhaven. The incumbent government of the Social Democratic Party (SPD) and The Greens retained its majority. However, Mayor and SPD leader Jens Böhrnsen resigned due to his party's poor performance, which was significantly below expectations. He was succeeded by fellow SPD member Carsten Sieling.

Analysts expressed surprise about the low turnout (just 50.1%), the lowest since 1945 in a west German state, and concern about a particularly low turnout in impoverished areas, which was seen as an indication of disillusionment with politics in these demographics.

Background
Following the election in 2011, the Social Democrats and Greens continued their coalition government from the previous legislative period. The composition changed several times since the last election following the death of Renate Möbius, later Martin Korol took her place in the SPD caucus. He soon after left the party and sat as an independent before joining the Citizens in Rage. For the CDU, Oğuzhan Yazıcı replaced Elisabeth Motschmann when she was elected to the Bundestag. There were personnel changes in the caucus of Alliance '90/The Greens as well.

Electoral system
Each voter may distribute five votes among party lists or candidates within them (cumulative voting and panachage). The state of Bremen consists of two cities, Bremen and Bremerhaven. Of the 83 members of the state legislature, 68 are elected in Bremen, 15 in Bremerhaven. To be allocated seats from either Bremen or Bremerhaven a party must receive 5% of the vote or more in the respective city. In Bremen (but not in Bremerhaven), the same ballot is also used to determine the composition of the city legislature, also consisting of 68 members who in most cases are the same as Bremen's representatives in the state legislature. Differences may, however, arise since EU citizens resident in Bremen who are not also German citizens may vote in city legislature elections but not in state legislature elections. In the 2003 elections, the 2007 elections, and the current election, this led to one or more of Bremen's seats being allocated to different candidates in the state legislature and in the city legislature.

The state government (Senate), the head of state government (President of the Senate), and the heads of the city governments (Mayor) are later elected by the respective legislatures.

All Germans who have lived in Bremen for at least three months prior to the election are eligible to vote. As of the last election, the voting age is 16, the eligibility age 18. Non-German EU citizens resident in Bremen may vote in city legislature elections but not in state legislature elections which for German citizens in Bremen (but not in Bremerhaven) happen with the same votes on the same ballot.

Parties
The table below lists parties represented in the previous Bürgerschaft of Bremen.

Opinion polls

Election result

|-
! rowspan="2" colspan="2" | Party
! rowspan="2" | Votes
! rowspan="2" | %
! rowspan="2" | +/-
! colspan="2" | Seats
! rowspan="2" | Totalseats
! rowspan="2" | +/-
! rowspan="2" | Seats %
|-
! Bremen
! Bremerhaven
|-
| bgcolor=| 
| align=left | Social Democratic Party (SPD)
| align=right| 383,509
| align=right| 32.8
| align=right| 5.8
| align=right| 24
| align=right| 6
| align=right| 30
| align=right| 7
| align=right| 36.1
|-
| bgcolor=| 
| align=left | Christian Democratic Union (CDU)
| align=right| 261,929
| align=right| 22.4
| align=right| 2.0
| align=right| 16
| align=right| 4
| align=right| 20
| align=right| 0
| align=right| 24.1
|-
| bgcolor=| 
| align=left | Alliance 90/The Greens (Grüne)
| align=right| 176,807
| align=right| 15.1
| align=right| 7.4
| align=right| 12
| align=right| 2
| align=right| 14
| align=right| 7
| align=right| 16.9
|-
| bgcolor=| 
| align=left | The Left (Linke)
| align=right| 111,485
| align=right| 9.5
| align=right| 3.9
| align=right| 7
| align=right| 1
| align=right| 8
| align=right| 3
| align=right| 9.6
|-
| bgcolor=| 
| align=left | Free Democratic Party (FDP)
| align=right| 76,754
| align=right| 6.6
| align=right| 4.2
| align=right| 5
| align=right| 1
| align=right| 6
| align=right| 6
| align=right| 7.2
|-
| bgcolor=| 
| align=left | Alternative for Germany (AfD)
| align=right| 64,368
| align=right| 5.5
| align=right| New
| align=right| 4
| align=right| 0
| align=right| 4
| align=right| New
| align=right| 4.8
|-
| bgcolor=| 
| align=left | Citizens in Rage (BiW)
| align=right| 37,759
| align=right| 3.2
| align=right| 0.5
| align=right| 0
| align=right| 1
| align=right| 1
| align=right| 0
| align=right| 1.2
|-
! colspan=8|
|-
| bgcolor=| 
| align=left | Die PARTEI (PARTEI)
| align=right| 21,888
| align=right| 1.9
| align=right| 1.9
| align=right| 0
| align=right| 0
| align=right| 0
| align=right| ±0
| align=right| 0
|-
| bgcolor=|
| align=left | Pirate Party Germany (Piraten)
| align=right| 17,773
| align=right| 1.5
| align=right| 0.4
| align=right| 0
| align=right| 0
| align=right| 0
| align=right| ±0
| align=right| 0
|-
| bgcolor=|
| align=left | Human Environment Animal Protection
| align=right| 13,910
| align=right| 1.2
| align=right| 1.2
| align=right| 0
| align=right| 0
| align=right| 0
| align=right| ±0
| align=right| 0
|-
| bgcolor=|
| align=left | National Democratic Party (NPD)
| align=right| 2,170
| align=right| 0.2
| align=right| 1.4
| align=right| 0
| align=right| 0
| align=right| 0
| align=right| ±0
| align=right| 0
|-
! align=right colspan=2| Total
! align=right| 1,168,352
! align=right| 100.0
! align=right| 
! align=right| 68
! align=right| 15
! align=right| 83
! align=right| ±0
! align=right| 
|-
! align=right colspan=2| Voter turnout
! align=right| 
! align=right| 50.2
! align=right| 5.3
! align=right| 
! align=right| 
! align=right| 
! align=right| 
! align=right| 
|}

References

Elections in Bremen (state)
2015 elections in Germany
May 2015 events in Germany